is a Japanese voice actress and singer who is currently affiliated with the Sony Music Artists agency. She made her voice acting debut in 2017 and in the same year, she was cast in her first main role as Kirara, the heroine of the Japanese mobile game Kirara Fantasia. She has also been cast in main roles in Märchen Mädchen, Love Live! Nijigasaki High School Idol Club, Sword Art Online Alternative Gun Gale Online and Chainsaw Man. In 2019, she won the Best New Actress Award with Manaka Iwami, Coco Hayashi, Rina Honnizumi, and Kaede Hondo.

Biography
Kusunoki was born in Tokyo on December 22, 1999. She became interested in entertainment at an early age; when she was three years old, she began taking piano lessons. She was also a member of her school's brass band during her junior high school years, and a member of a light music club during her high school years. She was also the student council president of her junior high school.

During her second year of junior high school, she became interested in anime. She particularly liked the series Kobato, and the portrayal of the lead character by Kana Hanazawa. This inspired her to become a voice actress. She decided to participate in an audition held by the agency Sony Music Artists. Because she felt that it would be difficult to pass the voice acting audition unless she had more experience, she instead auditioned as a singer. She ended up receiving the special prize at the competition.

Kusunoki made her debut as a voice actress in 2017, playing a background role in the anime series Eromanga Sensei. In June 2017, she was cast in her first main role as Kirara in the mobile game Kirara Fantasia. In 2018, she was cast as Hazuki Kagimura, the protagonist of the anime series Märchen Mädchen. She played the role of Llenn in the anime series Sword Art Online Alternative Gun Gale Online, for which she also sings the ending theme "To see the future". In the same year, she also became a part of Konami's media mix project called BandMeshi♪ (バンめし♪), with her voicing the guitarist Yokaze Tsuyuri. Later that year, she was cast as Setsuna Yūki in the Love Live! multimedia franchise. In 2019, she played the role of Melida Angel in the anime television series Assassins Pride; she also performed the series' ending theme .

In 2020, Kusunoki made her debut as a solo artist under Sacra Music. Her first EP, "Hamidashimono", is the ending theme of The Misfit of Demon King Academy.

In 2021, Kusunoki was diagnosed with a congenital disorder that caused her to have a tendency to feel pain and numbness when performing dance and other strenuous activities that involve large movements. Because of this, Kusunoki had refrained from any activities that involve large movements in both her solo activities and any performances she participated in.

In 2022, it was confirmed that Kusunoki has been diagnosed with Ehlers-Danlos Syndrome. Love Live! official website also announced she would retire from voicing Setsuna Yūki and Nana Nakagawa on March 31, 2023.

Filmography

TV series

Films

Web animation

Original video animation

Video games

Drama CD

Promotional Video
The Vexations of a Shut-In Vampire Princess PV (2019) Narriation/Komari 
Spy Classroom PV (2020) Code name <Forgetter>  
Heat the Pig Liver PV (2020) Jess
The Vexations of a Shut-In Vampire Princess Volume 2 PV (2019) Komari
I tried to read Dengeki Bunko aloud 
 Sankaku no Kyori wa Kagirinai Zero (2021)  
Tonari no kanojo to yofukashi gohan (2021)
Guild no Uketsukejou desu ga, Zangyou wa Iya nanode Boss wo Solo Toubatsu Shiyou to Omoimasu (2021)
Hello,Hello and Hello (2021)
Yūsha-kei ni Shosu Chōbatsu Yūsha 9004-tai Keimu Kiroku PV (2022) Theoritta
Ao no Outline PV (2022) Yuri Kashiwazaki
End of Arcadia PV (2022) Philia Lordrain
Blade & Bastard: warm ash Dusky dungeon (2022) Garbage

Audio drama
Märchen Mädchen Volume 4 limited edition bonus audio drama (2018)
 Yoru ni Kakeru Audio Drama (2021) Women

Radio
※internet Radio
 Märchen Mädchen Kusunoki Tomori's Minarai Radio (2017–2018)- Onsen※/ HiBiki RAdio Station※/ Super! A&G +※
 Sword Art Online Alternative Gun Gale Offline (2018)- Onsen※/ HiBiKi Radio Station※
 Kusunoki Tomori's Kirara Fantasia Radio (2018–2022)- AbemaRADIO※ 
 Love Live! Nijigasaki High School Idol Club~ Ohiruyasumi Housou shitsu (2018–2020)- HiBiKi Radio Station※
  Kusunoki Tomori's Tomoriru Candle (2018–present)- Onsen※
 Kaede Hondo and Kusunoki Tomori's FUN'S PROJECT LAB (2019–2020)- Nippon Cultural Broadcasting
 Assassins pradio (2019–2020)- HiBiKi Radio Station※
 Tomodachi no Imouto ga radio demo uzai (2019–present)- YouTube※ Twitter※ Irregular broadcast 
 Love Live! Nijigasaki High School Idol Club~ Ohayou Housou Shitsu (2020–2022)- HiBiKi Radio Station※
 Kusunoki Tomori The Music Reverie (2020–present)-Nippon Cultural Broadcasting 
 The Misfit of Demon King Academy History's Strongest Demon King Reincarnates and Appears in a Radio with His Descendants (2020–2021; 2023)- Onsen※
  25ji Night Radio de (2020–present)- YouTube※
 Shōsetsuka ni Narō Novel on Radio (2021)- FM802 April's monthly artist
 Endo and Kobayashi Live! The Latest on Tsundere Villainess Lieselotte with  facilitator Kusunoki (2023)- Onsen※

Other Works

Discography

Singles

Stream only

Albums
Unless stated otherwise, songs are composed and written by Kusunoki

Indies

Concert Video

Character songs

Refer to Love Live! Nijigasaki High School Idol Club for songs related to Love live! Nijigasaki High School Idol Club multimedia franchise.

Live concerts

Solo events

Joint events
Refer to Love Live! Nijigasaki High School Idol Club for events related to Love live! Nijigasaki High School Idol Club multimedia franchise.

References

Annotation

Members

Sources

External links

 Official agency profile 
 

1999 births
Living people
Anime singers
Japanese video game actresses
Japanese voice actresses
Nijigasaki High School Idol Club members
Voice actresses from Tokyo
21st-century Japanese actresses
21st-century Japanese singers
21st-century Japanese women singers
People with Ehlers–Danlos syndrome